Perry Township is one of sixteen townships in Buchanan County, Iowa, USA.  As of the 2000 census, its population was 3,044.

Geography 

The unincorporated community of Littleton is also in the township. According to the USGS, the township contains four cemeteries: Cedar Crest, Littleton, Saint Athanasius and Saint Michaels.

References

External links 

 US-Counties.com
 City-Data.com

Townships in Buchanan County, Iowa
Townships in Iowa